ANS College, Barh also known as Anugrah Narayan Singh College is a degree college in Barh, Bihar, India. It is a constituent unit of Patliputra University. College offers degrees in Arts, Science and conducts some vocational courses.

History 
College was established in 1951. It became the constituent unit of Magadh University in 1975. Later on, it became a constituent unit of Patliputra University in 2018.

Degrees and courses 
College offers the following degrees and courses.

 Bachelor's degree
 Bachelor of Arts
 Bachelor of Science
 Master's degree
 Master of Arts
 Master of Science
 Vocational course
 Bachelor of Computer Application
 Bachelor of Business Management

References

External links 

 Official website of college
 Patliputra University website

Constituent colleges of Patliputra University
Educational institutions established in 1951
Universities and colleges in Patna
1951 establishments in Bihar